The 2015 World Junior Figure Skating Championships was an international figure skating competition in the 2014–15 season. Commonly called "World Juniors" and "Junior Worlds", the event determined the World Junior champions in the disciplines of men's singles, ladies' singles, pair skating, and ice dancing.

The event was held on 2–8 March 2015 at the newly constructed Tondiraba Ice Hall in Tallinn, Estonia.

Records

The following new junior records were set during this competition:

Qualification
The competition was open to skaters from ISU member nations who were at least 13 but not 19—or 21 for male pair skaters and ice dancers—before July 1, 2014, in their place of birth. National associations selected their entries according to their own criteria but the ISU mandated that their selections achieve a minimum technical elements score (TES) at an international event prior to the Junior Worlds.

The term "Junior" in ISU competition refers to age, not skill level. Skaters may remain age-eligible for Junior Worlds even after competing nationally and internationally at the senior level. At junior events, the ISU requires that all programs conform to junior-specific rules regarding program length, jumping passes, types of elements, etc.

Number of entries per discipline
Based on the results of the 2014 World Junior Championships, the ISU allowed each country one to three entries per discipline.

Entries
Member nations began announcing their selections in January 2015. The ISU published the complete list of entries on 16 February 2015.

 On 21 February 2015, Sara Ghislandi / Giona Terzo Ortenzi withdrew from the ice dancing event. Italy selected Sofia Sforza / Leo Luca Sforza to replace them.
 On 27 February 2015, 2014 World Junior bronze medalists Maria Vigalova / Egor Zakroev withdrew from the pairs event. Russia named Daria Beklemisheva / Maxim Bobrov as their replacements.
 On 2 March 2015, Sweden's Illya Solomin withdrew from the men's event and was replaced by Nicky Obreykov.

Schedule

Results

Men

Ladies

Pairs

Ice dancing

Medals summary

Medalists
Medals for overall placement:

Small medals for placement in the short segment:

Small medals for placement in the free segment:

By country
Table of medals for overall placement:

Table of small medals for placement in the short segment:

Table of small medals for placement in the free segment:

References

External links

 2015 World Junior Figure Skating Championships
 Detailed results at the International Skating Union

World Junior
World Junior Figure Skating Championships
World Junior Figure Skating Championships
Figure
March 2015 sports events in Europe
21st century in Tallinn